In applied mathematics, the fast sweeping method is a numerical method for solving boundary value problems of the Eikonal equation.

 

 

The fast sweeping method is an iterative method which uses upwind difference for discretization and uses Gauss–Seidel iterations with alternating sweeping ordering to solve the discretized Eikonal equation on a rectangular grid. The origins of this approach lie in control theory.  Although fast sweeping methods have existed in control theory, it was first proposed for Eikonal equations by Hongkai Zhao, an applied mathematician at the University of California, Irvine.

Sweeping algorithms are highly efficient for solving Eikonal equations when the corresponding characteristic curves do not change direction very often.

References

See also 
 Fast marching method

Numerical differential equations
Partial differential equations
Hyperbolic partial differential equations